Tridrepana hainana is a moth in the family Drepanidae. It was described by Hong-Fu Chu and Lin-Yao Wang in 1988. It is found in Hainan, China.

Adults are similar to Tridrepana crocea, but can be distinguished by the male genitalic features.

References

Moths described in 1988
Drepaninae
Moths of Asia